The expression 'Eastern European Jewry' has two meanings. Its first meaning refers to the current political spheres of the Eastern European countries and its second meaning refers to the Jewish communities in Russia and Poland. The phrase 'Eastern European Jews' or 'Jews of the East' (from German: Ostjuden) was established during the 19th century in the German Empire and in the western provinces of the Austro-Hungarian Empire, aiming to distinguish the integrating Jews in Central Europe from those Jews who lived in the East. This feature deals with the second meaning of the concept of Eastern European Jewry- the Jewish groups that lived in Poland, Ukraine, Belarus, Latvia, Lithuania, Estonia, Russia, Romania, Hungary and modern-day Moldova in collective settlement (from Hebrew: Kibbutz- קיבוץ). Many of whom spoke Yiddish.

At the beginning of the 20th century, over 6 million Jews lived in Eastern Europe. They were organized into large and small communities, living in big cities such as Warsaw (with a population of about 300,000 Jews) as well as in small towns with populations of only tens or hundreds of Jews.

Before the 18th century 

At the beginning of the 16th century, the number of Jews who lived in Eastern Europe was estimated to be between 10,000 and 30,000. Some of their communities spoke Leshon Knaan and they observed various Non-Ashkenazi traditions and customs. In parts of Eastern Europe, before the arrival of the Ashkenazi Jews from Central Europe, some non-Ashkenazi Jews were present who spoke Leshon Knaan and held various other non-Ashkenazi traditions and customs. As early as the beginning of the 17th century, it was known that there were Jews living in cities of Lithuania who spoke "Russiany" (from Hebrew: רוסיתא) and did not know the "Ashkenaz tongue", i.e. German-Yiddish. In 1966, the historian Cecil Roth questioned the inclusion of all Yiddish speaking Jews as Ashkenazim in descent, suggesting that upon the arrival of Ashkenazi Jews from Central Europe to Eastern Europe, from the Middle Ages to the 16th century, there were already a substantial number of Jews there who later abandoned their original culture in favor of Ashkenazi culture. However, according to more recent research, mass migrations of Yiddish-speaking Ashkenazi Jews occurred to Eastern Europe from the west who increased due to high birth rates and absorbed and/or largely replaced the preceding non-Ashkenazi Jewish groups of Eastern Europe (the latter groups' numbers are estimated by demographer Sergio DellaPergola to have been small). In the mid-18th century, the number of Jews increased to about 750,000. During this period only one-third of East European Jews lived in areas with a predominantly Polish population. The rest of the Jews lived among other peoples, mainly in the Ukrainian and Russian-Lithuanian environments. The numerical increase was due to mass migration of Yiddish-speaking Ashkenazi Jews from Central Europe to Eastern Europe beginning from the Middle Ages to the 16th century, as well as a high birth rate among these immigrants. Genetic evidence also indicates that Yiddish-speaking Eastern European Jews largely descended from Ashkenazi Jews who migrated from central Europe and subsequently experienced high birthrates and genetic isolation.

In the mid-18th century, two-thirds of the Jewish population of Eastern Europe lived in cities or towns, and a third of it lived in villages - a unique phenomenon that hardly existed in Western Europe. In every village where Jews lived, there were only two Jewish families on average, and each family usually consisted of no more than ten Jews. In most of the urban localities in which they lived, the Jewish population comprised half the number of residents on average. It follows that in many towns, there was a Jewish majority. This reality has been intensified over the years, with the percentage of Jews in cities and towns increasing, and thus the "shtetl" phenomenon was created - the "Jewish town", a large part of which was Jewish, and whose Jewish cultural character was prominent.

Economics and commerce 
The Jews engaged in trade and various crafts, such as tailoring, weaving, leather processing and even agriculture. The economic activity of Eastern European Jewry was different from that of Central and Western European Jews: in Eastern Europe, the Jews developed specializations in trade, leasing, and crafts, which were hardly found in Western Europe. The Eastern European Jewry also had a great deal of involvement in economic matters that Jews in Central and Western Europe did not deal with at all.

Until the mid-17th century with the 1648 Cossack riots on Jewish population, eastern European Jews lived in a relatively comfortable environment that enabled them to thrive. The Jews, for the most part, enjoyed extensive economic, personal and religious freedom. Thus, for example, deportations, foreclosure of Jewish property, and the removal of financial debts of non-Jews to Jews, which were common in Western Europe, hardly existed in the East. Despite the privileges, there were also hatred expressions towards the Jews. This phenomenon was described by a Jewish sage named Shlomo Maimon:

Traditional life 
The amount of Torah study among Eastern European Jews at the beginning of their settlement was little. As a result, many halakhic (from Hebrew: הלכתיות) questions and problems were addressed to rabbis and Torah scholars in Germany and Bohemia which were close to them. From the 16th century, luxurious study centers were established in Eastern Europe, where the Hassidic movement also began to develop.

Social Structure 
The Jewish social structure in Eastern Europe was built of communities and from the mid-16th century to 1764, central institutions, including communal ones, of self-leadership in Eastern Europe were running. The two main institutions were the Four-State Committee and the Lithuanian State Council. The committees' role was to collect taxes from the Jewish communities and deliver them to the authorities. Later they took it upon themselves to represent the Jewish community to the foreign rulers of those countries. In addition, the committee had judicial authority over internal laws and Halachot (from Hebrew: הלכות) within the Jewish communities.

The Council of Four Lands was the highest institution among the committees. The committee was composed out of seven rabbinic judges when the head of them was always a representative of the Lublin community. The other members of the committee were representatives of the cities of Poznan, Krakow and Lvov. Historical documents bearing the Committee's signature indicate that in certain periods the committee was expanded to represent all the important communities in the kingdom, and then the number of representatives was close to thirty. At first, the committee met in Lublin, giving the city the status of a top-notch Jewish center. The conference, which lasted about two weeks, was held once a year during the winter, when the city's largest trade fair was coordinated. In a later period, the conference was held twice a year: a winter gathering in Lublin and a summer conference in the city of Yaroslav in Galicia.

From the late 18th century to the beginning of the 20th century 
In the late 18th century, the Jews of Eastern Europe were divided into two major geographic regions: a settlement controlled by the Russian Empire, and a Galicia under the control of the Austria-Hungarian Empire.

The settlement 
The three divisions of Poland (first in 1772, then in 1793, and finally in 1795) left the Aryan part of the Polish Jewry under the authority of the Russian Empire. The Russian government turned out to be less tolerant towards Jews, and more restrictions were imposed on Jews than the rest of the Polish people. In 1791 Czarina Yekaterina the Great established the region of the Settlement (the 'Moshav') in the western fringes of the empire, where only Jews were allowed to live. The Moshav included most of the former territories of Poland and Lithuania, which were populated by concentrations of Jews. Limiting those boundaries led to the uprooting and deportation of Moscow and St. Petersburg Jews to the eastern border of the country, which was one of the main goals of the authorities. Later, the Jews of Kiev were also forbidden to live in their own city, even though Kiev itself was included in the "region of the Settlement."

At the beginning of the 20th century, more than five million Jews lived in Czarist Russia, with 90% of them concentrated in the region of the Settlement and about three million Jews lived in the former borders of Poland. According to various estimates, Eastern European Jewry at the beginning of the 20th century constituted 80% of world Jewry.

Galicia 

Another large Jewish community in Eastern Europe was Galicia, the territory that was given to Austria in the partition of Poland. Towards the end of the 19th century, Emperor Franz Joseph intended to "acculturate" the Jews by establishing a network of schools for general studies. Some Jews supported this goal, but most of them opposed it. Further resistance arose when an attempt was made to settle the Jews on the land.

The Jews in Galicia were known for their religious piety, and they fought hard against the Enlightenment and against attempts to "assimilate" them culturally. There was also a sharp confrontation between supporters of Hasidism and those opposed to it (Misnagdim). Eventually Hasidism won and became the dominant movement among the Jews of Galicia.

In 1867, the Jews of Galicia were granted full equality of rights, and thus were the first among the Jews of Eastern Europe to be emancipated. The Zionist movement flourished in Galicia. During the 19th century and the beginning of the 20th century, before World War I the Jewish community flourished in Galicia. A large number of books and poems were published there, many Torah sages were engaged in it and Zionism and Yiddish culture also emerged. At the beginning of the 20th century, the number of Jews in Galicia reached more than 800,000.

Antisemitism
Antisemitism in Switzerland in the years between the  First and Second World Wars was mostly directed towards the so-called Ostjuden who were perceived as having a foreign dress and culture. In fact, Ostjuden were explicitly mentioned by Heinrich Rothmund, the head of the Swiss federal Alien Police: "...we are not such horrible monsters after all. But we do not let anyone walk all over us, especially Eastern Jews, who, as it is well known, try and try again to do just that, because they think a straight line is crooked, here our position is probably in complete agreement with our Swiss people."

As antisemitism in Germany escalated after the First World War, German Jews were divided with regard to how they felt about the Yiddish-speaking Eastern European Jews. Some German Jews, who were wrestling with the notion of their own German identity, became more accepting of a shared identity with Eastern Jewry. The Austrian novelist Joseph Roth depicted the misfortunes of Eastern European Jewry in the aftermath of the First World War in his novel The Wandering Jews. After the Nuremberg Laws were passed in 1935, Roth said that the archetype of the "Wandering Jew" now extended to the identity of the German Jews, who he described as being "more homeless than even his cousin in Lodz".

See also 
 Ashkenazi Jews
 History of the Jews in Poland
 History of the Jews in Russia
 History of the Jews in Ukraine
 Council of Four Lands
 Shtetl
 Pale of Settlement

References

Sources
 
 
 
 
 
 
 
Jews and Judaism in Europe by region
Jews
Jewish
Judaism
Jewish